Hans Kann (born 14 February 1927 in Vienna; died 24 June 2005) was an Austrian pianist and composer. He taught music in his native Austria and in Japanese schools such as the Tokyo National University of Fine Arts and Music.

He was the son of businessman Emil Kann and Karoline Kann.

Awards 
 1961 and 1963 Körner foundation prize
 1984 Nestroy Ring
 1987 Austrian Cross of Honour for Science and Art, 1st class
 1994 Medal of the Japanese Emperor

References

Austrian classical pianists
Male classical pianists
Austrian male composers
Austrian composers
Musicians from Vienna
Austrian Jews
1927 births
2005 deaths
Recipients of the Austrian Cross of Honour for Science and Art, 1st class
20th-century classical pianists
20th-century male musicians
Austrian expatriates in Japan
JVC Records artists